The Color of Money is a 1986 American sports drama film directed by Martin Scorsese and released by Touchstone Pictures. The film was created from a screenplay by Richard Price, based on the 1984 novel of the same name by Walter Tevis. The film stars Paul Newman and Tom Cruise, with Mary Elizabeth Mastrantonio, Helen Shaver, and John Turturro in supporting roles. It features an original score by Robbie Robertson, and was released on October 17, 1986, after a premier a week earlier at the Ziegfeld Theater in New York City in New York. The film grossed $52.3 million at the box office.

The film continues the story of pool hustler and  Edward "Fast Eddie" Felson from Tevis's first novel, The Hustler (1959), with Newman reprising his role from the 1961 film adaptation. It begins more than 25 years after the events of the previous film, with Eddie retired from the pool circuit. Newman won the Academy Award for Best Actor for his performance, his first Oscar win after seven nominations. The film centers around the game of nine-ball, a pool variant played for high stakes. A challenge nine-ball match was named after it in 1997 at which Efren Reyes defeated Earl Strickland to win the largest single match purse in pool history of $100,000.

Plot
The film continues the story of pool hustler and stakehorse Edward "Fast Eddie" Felson from the novel The Hustler. Felson is a former pool hustler turned successful liquor salesman in Chicago. He still stakes bets for players, including fellow hustler Julian, who is outmatched at nine-ball by the young and charismatic Vincent. Recognizing Vincent's skill, and his girlfriend Carmen's inexperience at luring players to lose money, Eddie tells the couple of their excellent potential for hustling.

Carmen visits Eddie alone to inquire about his interest in Vincent. Finding him working at Child World, Eddie invites Vincent to leave the next day for six weeks of hustling on the road, culminating in a nine-ball tournament in Atlantic City. Manipulating Vincent's insecurities about Carmen and giving him a valuable Balabushka cue stick, Eddie persuades him to accept his offer. Eddie's abrupt departure upsets Julian, as well as Eddie's girlfriend Janelle.

Vincent and Carmen hit the road with Eddie in his Cadillac, visiting a series of pool halls. Serving as Vincent's , Eddie attempts to teach him the art of hustling, but Vincent chafes at having to play below his ability. At a pool hall run by his old acquaintance Orvis, Eddie becomes fed up with Vincent's arrogance and leaves him. In Vince's absence, Eddie reminds Carmen they are partners with a mutual business interest in Vincent. Eddie returns to find Vincent grandstanding to "Werewolves of London," beating the pool hall's best player but scaring off a wealthier . Eddie and Vincent talk frankly, agreeing Vincent must curb his ego if they are to succeed.

Eddie and Carmen struggle to rein in Vincent's showboating, and his jealousy when they pose as lovers during a scam. After a string of successful games, Vincent plays the famed Grady Seasons, but is directed by Eddie to  the game, to inflate the odds against Vincent in Atlantic City. Goaded by Grady, Vincent almost fails to throw the game, and Eddie is inspired to play again. After some success, Eddie is taken by a  named Amos. Humiliated, Eddie leaves Vincent and Carmen with enough money to make it to Atlantic City, taking the Balabushka.

Eddie refines his skills at Orvis's pool hall, gets into shape by swimming laps, and gets a pair of corrective lens sunglasses. On a winning streak, he enters the Atlantic City tournament and runs into Vincent and Carmen, overhearing them arrange a bet with another player. Eddie, winning against Julian, and Vincent, beating Grady, are set to face each other. Janelle arrives to support Eddie, who triumphs against Vincent. As Eddie and Janelle celebrate, Vincent and Carmen surprise Eddie with $8,000 – his “cut” of Vincent's winnings from intentionally losing their match.

In his semifinal match, Eddie sees his reflection in the two-ball; disgruntled, he forfeits the game and returns Vincent's money. With plans to live with Janelle, and determined to win legitimately, Eddie faces Vincent in a private match, declaring "I'm back!"

Cast
 Paul Newman as Eddie 'Fast Eddie' Felson
 Tom Cruise as Vincent Lauria
 Mary Elizabeth Mastrantonio as Carmen
 Helen Shaver as Janelle
 John Turturro as Julian
 Bill Cobbs as Orvis
 Forest Whitaker as Amos
 Keith McCready as Grady Seasons

Production

The Color of Money was released by Touchstone Pictures, after both 20th Century Fox and Columbia Pictures declined. The film was shot over 49 days, with cinematographer Michael Ballhaus and a budget of $14.5 million. It is an adaptation of the 1984 novel of the same name by Walter Tevis and was written by Richard Price. While featuring some characters from the novel, it was not written to be a sequel. A screenplay was written by Tevis but the filmmakers decided not to use it. Jean-Pierre Léaud was briefly considered for the role of Vincent. It was shot in and around Chicago, with much of the filming taking place in pool and billiard halls, and not in built sets. The film was edited by Thelma Schoonmaker, who used close-up shots of pool balls being played, as well as wider visuals of the players to get across the visual of a pool hall.

Scorsese has cited the influence of techniques and lighting in the 1947 Powell–Pressburger Black Narcissus in making the film. In particular, he states that the extreme close ups of Tom Cruise around the pool table were inspired by those of the nuns in that film. Lead star Paul Newman said that the best advice he was given by Scorsese was to "try not to be funny." Cruise performed most of his own pool shots. Scorsese believed Cruise could learn the shot, but that it would take too long, so the shot was performed for him by professional player Mike Sigel. Cruise mentioned that to prepare for the role, he bought a pool table for his apartment and practiced for hours on end. Standing in for the extremely valuable "Balabushka"  in the movie was actually a Joss J-18 (which later became the Joss 10-N7), made to resemble a classic Balabushka.

Sigel was a technical director, and he and fellow player Ewa Mataya Laurance served as technical consultants and shot performers on the film. Absent from the film is the character Minnesota Fats, played by Jackie Gleason in The Hustler. Newman later said that he had wanted the character to appear, but that none of the attempts to include him fit well into the story that was being written. According to Scorsese, Gleason apparently agreed with Newman's opinion that Minnesota Fats was not essential to the film's story. Scorsese said that Gleason was presented a draft of the script that had Fats worked into the narrative, but that upon reading it, Gleason declined to reprise the role because he felt that the character seemed to have been added as "an afterthought".

Soundtrack
The soundtrack to the motion picture was released by MCA Records in 1986. Robbie Robertson produced the score for the film.

Track listing:

 "Who Owns This Place?" (Don Henley/Danny Kortchmar/J.D. Souther) – Don Henley (4:55)
 "It's in the Way That You Use It" (Eric Clapton/Robbie Robertson) – Eric Clapton (4:00)
 "Let Yourself In For It" (Palmer) – Robert Palmer (5:20)
 "Don't Tell Me Nothin'" (Willie Dixon) – Willie Dixon (4:42)
 "Two Brothers And A Stranger" (Mark Knopfler) – Mark Knopfler (2:42)
 "Standing On The Edge Of Love" (Jerry Lynn Williams) – B.B. King (3:59)
 "Modern Blues" (Robbie Robertson) – Robbie Robertson (2:57)
 "Werewolves of London" (L. Marinell/Waddy Wachtel/Warren Zevon) – Warren Zevon (3:24)
 "My Baby's In Love With Another Guy" (H. Brightman/L. Lucie) – Robert Palmer (2:30)
 "The Main Title" (Robbie Robertson) – Robbie Robertson (2:46)

Release
The Color of Money held its world premiere at the Ziegfeld Theater in New York City in New York, on October 8, 1986. The film was commercially released in the United States on October 17, 1986. The American release was limited to only select theatres throughout the country, with the film opening in more theatres during the next four weeks of its initial release. After its run, the film grossed $52,293,982 domestically. The film was released on DVD on January 3, 2000, and on Blu-ray on June 5, 2012.

Reception

Critical response

The Color of Money received a positive critical response upon its release, though some critics thought that the film was an inferior followup to The Hustler. Based on 48 reviews collected by Rotten Tomatoes, the film received an 88% approval rating from critics, with an average score of 7.10/10. It comments that "it's inferior to the original goes without saying, but Paul Newman and Tom Cruise are a joy to watch, and Martin Scorsese's direction is typically superb." Media review aggregator website Metacritic reported a weighted average score of 77/100 based on 17 critics, indicating "generally favorable reviews". Audiences polled by CinemaScore gave the film an average grade of "B−" on an A+ to F scale.

The film was praised for the major cast. Vincent Canby writing for The New York Times commented on the "three fully realized" main characters, and the journey throughout the film with them is "most satisfying". Canby, however, also commented that it "lacks in narrative shapeliness", before giving the film 9/10. Sheila Benson for the Los Angeles Times called these characters an "electrifying unholy trio", and praising the metaphors between hustling and pool. Miami Herald writer Bill Cosford, however, commented that "whatever Scorsese and Price have to say about these marvelous characters, it is not anything interesting." Tom Hutchingson of Radio Times said that Newman "deserved" to win an Oscar for his performance.

Reviewers compared The Color of Money with other Scorsese films. Jason Bailey, writing for Flavorwire, described that the film was only "mid-level" for the director, but that it was so "overpowering ... jazzy and boisterous" that he couldn't help but enjoy. The Chicago Tribune Gene Siskel commented that the "grit is gone", as Scorsese wasn't backed up by a veteran contributor as in his other works. People Magazine commented that the film benefited from the cast of characters, and Scorsese's choice of actors.

Accolades
For The Color of Money Newman received the Academy Award for Best Actor, his first Academy Award and his seventh nomination.

Legacy
A line in the film spoken by Tom Cruise's character—"In here? Doom"—inspired the title of the popular 1993 video game, Doom. The 1996 nine-ball challenge match between Efren Reyes and Earl Strickland was named "The Color of Money" in honor of the film. This is equally true for the second challenge, which took place in 2001 and was titled "The Color of Money II".

See also

References

External links

 
 
 
 
 

1986 films
1986 drama films
1980s American films
American drama films
American sequel films
Color sequels of black-and-white films
Cue sports films
Films based on American novels
Films about gambling
Films directed by Martin Scorsese
Films featuring a Best Actor Academy Award-winning performance
Films scored by Robbie Robertson
Films set in Atlantic City, New Jersey
Films shot in Chicago
Films with screenplays by Richard Price (writer)
Touchstone Pictures films